Centreport Aqueduct is a historic aqueduct located in the town of Brutus near Weedsport in Cayuga County, New York. The aqueduct was constructed in 1854-1857 as a part of the Weedsport section of the "Improved Erie Canal."  The wood and stone aqueduct carried the Erie Canal over Cold Spring Brook near its juncture with North Brook. The aqueduct structure is approximately 125 feet in length, 125 feet in width, and 16 feet in height. Improvements were made to the aqueduct in 1895 as part of the "Nine Million Dollar Improvement."  The aqueduct ceased being used after development of the New York State Barge Canal System in 1917.  The aqueduct stone work is still intact and is the prime feature of a roadside park constructed by the New York State Department of Transportation in 1972 with the assistance of the Weedsport Lions Club.

It was listed on the National Register of Historic Places in 2000.

References

External links
Traces of the Erie Canal - Centreport Aqueduct
The Erie Canal, Howard J. Finley and The Weedsport Library (1998)

Transportation buildings and structures on the National Register of Historic Places in New York (state)
Navigable aqueducts in the United States
Transport infrastructure completed in 1857
Buildings and structures in Cayuga County, New York
Aqueducts in New York (state)
Erie Canal parks, trails, and historic sites
National Register of Historic Places in Cayuga County, New York
Aqueducts on the National Register of Historic Places
1857 establishments in New York (state)